Jaipur is a card game for two players. It was created by Sébastien Pauchon in 2009 and published by Asmodee.  Players assume the roles of powerful merchants in Jaipur, the capital of Rajasthan. The aim is to receive two "seals of excellence" and be invited to the court of the Maharaja. The game focuses on buying, exchanging, and selling at better prices, all while keeping an eye on both your camel herds.

Gameplay
Each turn, a player chooses between acquiring new goods from the market by using "tokens representing money", or selling goods in exchange for tokens. Selling a larger batch of goods earns a bonus.

Reception 
Overall, the board game has received favorable reviews, many acknowledging its simplicity, yet sufficient depth. Shut Up & Sit Down have suggested that "great game for seasoned vets but also something you could easily introduce to people who don’t play a lot" whereas iSlayTheDragon said "Jaipur is a blast to play". Board Game Land has suggested that the game was "one of the top card games for couples".
Jaipur has continued to be a popular game with recommendations into 2020 as well as being part of the Mind Sports Olympiad 2020 competition.

Honors
 2010 Fairplay À la carte Winner (Germany)
 2010 Golden Geek Best 2-Player Board Game Nominee (USA)
 2010 Golden Geek Best Card Game Nominee (USA)
 2010 International Gamers Award - General Strategy: Two-players (Global)
 2010 Lys Grand Public Finalist (France)
 2010 Spiel des Jahres Recommended (Germany)
 2011 Games Magazine Best New Family Card Game Winner (USA)
 2014 Juego del Año Winner (Spain)

References

External links
 Jaipur at BoardGameGeek.

Board games introduced in 2009